Bishop Byrne High School may refer to:
 Bishop Byrne High School (Tennessee) - Memphis, Tennessee
 Bishop Byrne High School (Texas) - Port Arthur, Texas